Ramón Romero (January 8, 1959 – October 13, 1988) was a professional baseball pitcher. He pitched parts of two seasons in Major League Baseball, 1984 and 1985, both for the Cleveland Indians.

Romero died in the Bronx in 1988 while attempting to flee police via his apartment's fire escape. He was under suspicion of selling crack cocaine. His death was not reported in any baseball sources until more than two decades later.

References

Sources 

1959 births
1988 deaths
Accidental deaths from falls
Accidental deaths in New York (state)
Batavia Trojans players
Buffalo Bisons (minor league) players
Chattanooga Lookouts players
Cleveland Indians players
Dominican Republic expatriate baseball players in the United States
Hagerstown Suns players

Maine Guides players
Major League Baseball pitchers
Major League Baseball players from the Dominican Republic
Orlando Twins players
Pulaski Phillies players
Toledo Mud Hens players
Waterloo Indians players
Wausau Timbers players